This is a list of all teams and players who have won the Leinster Senior Club Hurling Championship since its inception in 1970.

By team

The 50 Leinster Senior Club Hurling Championships have been won by 18 different teams. Ballyhale Shamrocks have won the most titles. The current champions are Ballyhale Shamrocks, who won the title in 2019.

By year

References